The Spolt Child (Bengali: Alaler Gharer Dulal আলালের ঘরের দুলাল;  published in 1857) is a Bengali novel by Peary Chand Mitra (1814–1883). The writer used the pseudonym Tekchand Thakur for this novel.

The novel describes the society of the nineteenth century Calcutta, and the bohemian lifestyle of the protagonist named Matilal. The novel is a landmark in the history of Bengali language and Bengali literature, as it used Cholitobhasa (colloquial form of the Bengali language) for the first time in print. The novel also happens to be one of the earliest Bengali novels. The simple prose style introduced in the novel came to be known as "Alali language". The novel was first published serially in a monthly magazine, Masik Patrika. Later, a dramatised version was staged at the Bengal Theatre (January 1875).

Footnotes

References
 
 Bhattacharya, Ramkrishna, Alal in Translation
 Alaler Gharer Dulal, Encyclopaedia of Indian Literature: A-Devo (1987) ed. Amaresh Datta, p. 126

External links

 Project Gutenberg eBook on 'The Spoilt Child'
 https://archive.org/details/TheSpoiltChild

1857 novels
19th-century Indian novels
Bengali-language literature
Bengali-language novels
Novels set in Kolkata